High Water is a 1997 studio album credited to Texas-based blues rock band The Fabulous Thunderbirds, though the album is a collaboration between Thunderbirds frontman Kim Wilson and studio musicians (and producers) Steve Jordan and Danny Kortchmar. Wilson, Kortchmar and Jordan are the only musicians to appear on the album.

Track listing
 "Too Much of Everything" (Wilson, Kortchmar, Jordan)
 "Do Right by Me"  (Jordan, Wilson)
 "Tortured"  (Wilson, Kortchmar)
 "High Water" (Wilson, Jordan, Kortchmar)
 "Hurt on Me" (Jordan, Wilson)
 "Hand to Mouth"  (Wilson, Kortchmar)
 "Promises You Can't Keep" (Wilson, Kortchmar, Jordan)
 "I Can't Have You" (Wilson, Jordan)
 "Too Hot to Handle" (Kortchmar, Wilson)
 "Save It For Someone Who Cares" (Wilson, Jordan)
 "It's About Time" (Wilson, Jordan)
 "That's All I Need to Know" (Jordan, Wilson)

Personnel
Kim Wilson - vocals, guitar, harp
Steve Jordan - drums, guitar, bass guitar, background vocals (except on 6)
Danny Kortchmar - guitar, organ, piano, programming, background vocals (except on 5)

References

External links
Official Site

1997 albums
The Fabulous Thunderbirds albums
Albums produced by Danny Kortchmar